Ali Kaabi (born 15 November 1953) is a retired Tunisian footballer.

Kaabi made 72 appearances and scored nine goals for the Tunisia national football team from 1973 to 1982, and he participated in the 1978 FIFA World Cup. In Tunisia's first ever World Cup finals match, he scored a game-tying goal in a 3–1 win over Mexico, making Kaabi Tunisia's first-ever World Cup goalscorer. He played as a defender.

References

External links

1953 births
Living people
Tunisian footballers
Tunisia international footballers
1978 FIFA World Cup players
1978 African Cup of Nations players
1982 African Cup of Nations players
Competitors at the 1975 Mediterranean Games
Mediterranean Games bronze medalists for Tunisia
Al Hilal SFC players
Association football defenders
Mediterranean Games medalists in football
Tunisian expatriate sportspeople in Saudi Arabia
Expatriate footballers in Saudi Arabia
Tunisian expatriate footballers
Saudi Professional League players
20th-century Tunisian people
21st-century Tunisian people